Pavlin may refer to:

Kim Daniela Pavlin (born 1992), Croatian swimmer
Luka Pavlin (born 1988), Slovenian footballer
Miran Pavlin
Žiga Pavlin
Pavlin Demski
Pavlin Dhembi
Pavlin Ivanov (basketball)
Pavlin Todorov

See also

Paulin (disambiguation)